Nathaniel White (born 1960) is an American serial killer.

Nathaniel White may also refer to:

Nathaniel White (businessman) (1811–1880), American businessman
Nathaniel Whitworth White (1837–1916), Canadian lawyer and politician
Nate White (Nathaniel Ridgway White, 1910–1984), American journalist
Nathaniel White, man who was mistaken for the serial killer Nathaniel White

See also
Nat Harper (Nathaniel White Harper, 1865–1954), Australian politician
Nathaniel N. Whiting (1792–1872), Baptist minister
Nathaniel Whiting (mill owner) (1609-c. 1682), Massachusetts settler